Pensando En Ti is the second studio album from Duranguense band K-Paz de la Sierra. It also included a bonus DVD.

Track listing
Volveré
La Pajarera
Mi Princesa Y Tu Rey
La Vecinita
Bailando En El Rancho
Si Tu Te Fueras De Mi
Amor No Me Ignores
Vamos A Bailar
Aullando Los Lobos
La Daga
Lucio Vázquez
La Movidita

Chart performance

Singles

Sales and certifications

References

Notes
K-Paz de la Sierra Official MySpace

K-Paz de la Sierra albums
2004 albums